Raghuveer was an Indian actor and director in the Kannada film industry.

Film career
Raghuveer came to the Kannada film industry as a hero through Ajay Vijay back in 1990. Though he made his debut as a hero alongside Murali in Ajay Vijay, it was S. Narayan's Chaitrada Premanjali which catapulted him to success.

He then went on to act and produce many films, such as Ajay Vijay, Naviloora Naidile, Kaaveri Theeradalli, Shrungaara Kaavya and Thungabhadra.

Partial filmography
 All movies are in Kannada.

Death
He was admitted to Sagar Apollo hospital in BTM Layout and died on 8 May 2014 night due to a heart attack. He was survived that time by his second wife Gowri and daughter. His first wife Sindhu died in 2005.

References

External links 
 

Date of birth missing
Place of birth missing
Male actors in Kannada cinema
Indian male film actors
2014 deaths
1963 births
Male actors from Bangalore
Male actors in Hindi cinema
20th-century Indian male actors
21st-century Indian male actors
Kannada film producers
Film producers from Bangalore